Akkermansia glycanphila is a species of intestinal mucin-degrading bacterium. It was first isolated from reticulated python (Malayopython reticulatus) feces in 2016.

Etymology
The genus was named for Antoon DL Akkermans (1940–2006), a Dutch microbiologist recognized for his contribution to microbial ecology, and the epithet from the New Latin and Greek meaning "glycan-loving".

Biology and biochemistry
A. glycaniphila, like, A. muciniphila is Gram-negative, strictly anaerobic, non-motile, non-spore-forming, oval-shaped bacterium. The typestrain is PytT (=DSM100705T=CIP 110913T). A. glycaniphila is able to use mucin as its sole source of carbon and nitrogen. It is culturable under the same conditions as A. muciniphilia, (anaerobic conditions on medium containing gastric mucin). When grown on soft agar mucin medium, colonies appear white with a diameter of 0.7mm. The long axis of single cells is 0.6–1.0 μm. Cells are covered with filaments, and occur singly, in pairs, in short chains and in aggregates.

The bacterial genome of A. glucaniphila PytT is encoded on a single chromosome of 3,074,121 bp. The G+C content is 57.6% and contains 2,532 coding regions, all 21 tRNA genes, and three complete rRNA operons. For 72% (1,811) of the coding sequences, a function could be predicted. Genome analysis revealed the presence of many mucin-degrading enzymes, of which a number are predicted to be secreted: 54 glycoside hydrolases, one glycosyl hydrolase, seven sialidases, and three sulfatases. The PytT genome is predicted to encode a cytochrome bd ubiquinol oxidase, indicating the potential for aerobic respiration.

The complete genome of A. glycaniphilia has been sequenced.

Ecology
This bacterium probably inhabits oxic-anoxic interface of the intestinal mucin layer. This was demonstrated for A. muciniphila MucT.
16s rRNA gene amplicon sequencing reveals that the genus Akkermansia have been detected in animals with a wide variety of GI tract anatomy (foregut, hindgut, or simple) and in diet (from herbivores to omnivores and carnivores). It has been found in mammals both wild and domesticated, and in non-mammals like birds, fish and reptiles like the Burmese python. Mucin types, and the glycan types expressed, vary between these organisms, but mucus is a consistent feature of their intestinal tracts. It may be that mucus-colonizing microbes have a role in protecting the host against intestinal pathogens and contribute to restoration of the microbiota.

References

External links
 Type strain of Akkermansia glycaniphila at BacDive -  the Bacterial Diversity Metadatabase

Verrucomicrobiota
Bacteria described in 2016
Gram-negative bacteria